Phahurat or Pahurat, often known as Thailand's Little India, is an ethnic neighborhood surrounding Phahurat Road in Wang Burapha Phirom Subdistrict, Phra Nakhon District, Bangkok. The area that would become Phahurat was an enclave of Annamese (Vietnamese) immigrants who came to Siam during the reign of King Taksin (1768–1782). In 1898, a first broke out and paved way for a road which was named "Bahurada", commonly spelled today as Phahurat or Pahurat (as it is pronounced), by King Chulalongkorn in remembrance of his daughter Princess Bahurada Manimaya (RTGS: Phahurat Manimai) who had died at young age.

Many of today's Phahurat residents are of South Asian descent. A Sikh community settled there more than a century ago and established a textile trading center that is still thriving. The golden-domed Siri Guru Singh Sabha temple is a landmark of Phahurat. The neighborhood is also home to South Asian Hindus and Muslims.

For the road, Phahurat is a short route that is divided into two parts. The first is the road continues from Ban Mo Road at Ban Mo Intersection ended up at the point where it meet Tri Phet Road, known as Phahurat Intersection, while the second separates itself from the left side of Chak Phet Road to the termination at Phahurat Intersection, both parts are one-way roads.

The sprawling of Chinese shops from the nearby Chinatown are slowly encroaching on Phahurat, but South Asian restaurants and businesses still dominate the area. It is home to some of Bangkok's more unusual shopping sites, including the sprawling Sampheng Market (Saphan Han), The Old Siam Plaza, and Nightingale–Olympic, with the four-storey India Emporium.

See also

Sikhism in Thailand

References

Indian diaspora in Thailand
Streets in Bangkok
Little Indias
Neighbourhoods of Bangkok
Shopping districts and streets in Thailand
Phra Nakhon district